Barbara Baska (Budapest, 17 July 1984) is a graphic designer and cinematographer.

Biography 
Born on 17 July 1984. in Budapest, Hungary. Her talent has showed itself early, she began her studies in a drawing class in Városmajor secondary school, located in Budapest. After the high school she attended the Hungarian University of Fine Arts, Department of Graphic Design, and graduated in 2008. 
In 2004 Her first success was in Athens at International Antismoking Festival where her poster won the First Prize.

During her studies she already worked as a graphic designer. In those years she worked much on identities, posters, web pages, 3D modelling, .

During her graphic design studies she attended the University of Theatre and Film Arts, Budapest, department of Cinematography. Her teacher was Tibor Máthé.
She studied also at Universidade Lusófona, Lisbon. She participate on Hungarian Graphic Design Biennials since 2004.
In 2007 her poster won the Ferrari Award in Budapest and received the Award in Torino.

In 2008 she turned towards design, and began working on graphics, product design and film making.

She won Erasmus scholarship on both universities. 
About the same time she designed the Globall – Football Park and Sport Hotel**** identity and visual design and she designed the identity, posters, CD/DVD covers and music video for the famous Hungarian band Magna Cum Laude, which achieved great success. 
In 2012 her short film "Pre" nominated for Golden-Eye Award.

At age 27, in year 2011, she directed her diploma movie what was an adaption of The Little Prince. The title of the film is Kelen. Her premier was in Uránia national movie theatre at the same year. The film was invited to the Hungarian Film Week. Her supervisor was Lajos Koltai.

Her identities and graphics can be found on many international design blogs and design books. She is one of founders of Csopaki Művésztelep, the Hungarian young talents art camp.

Awards 
2004 International Antismoking Festival, Athens, Greece (First prize)
2005 Touches of the Reneissance workshop, Florence, Italy (First prize)
2006 Erasmus Scholarship 
2006 French Night of Art, Corsica (First prize)
2007 Hungarian Red Cross
2007 KDB Bank Tender
2007 Ferrari tender, Torino, Italy (Public Award, Shell Award)
2007 Chocolate packaging competition, Hungary (First prize)
2008 Budapest Art Expo, MûvészetMalom, Szentendre, Hungary (Genezis short film)
2009 Designer of the week Award, QuarkXPress
2010 HSC Golden-Eye Award nomination, Budapest (Pre short film)
2012 Women of Excellence Award 2012 nomination, American Chamber of Commerce in Hungary, Budapest

Filmography
2012
"Flashmob project" – director, editor
2011
"Kelen" short film – director, cinematographer
"Café Kör" short film – cinematographer
2010
"Well Under the Sun" short film– cinematographer
"Forest" short film – director, cinematographer
"Pluszminusz" short film – cinematographer
"PRE" short film – director, cinematographer (Golden-Eye Award nomination)
2009
"Felnőttek Mind" short film– cinematographer
"Engem nem lehet szeretni" music video (Magna Cum Laude) – director, cinematographer
2008
"Óperenciám" short film– cinematographer
"Market Zrt." promotion film – director, cinematographer
2007
"Genezis" short film – director
"8" short film – cinematographer
Hungarian Red Cross TVspot – director
"Modell" documentary film – director

External links

Barbara Baska homepage
Barbara Baska short films
Barbara Baska on the Behance Network
Barbara Baska on the Linkedin
Interview with Barbara Baska on Hungarian Film Week
Interview with Barbara Baska about the New Talent Mission
Hungarian Graphic Design Biennial
Flashmob, Budapest, Hungary
Designterminal
The Genetics of Art Exhibition
Barbara Baska on Adweek Talent Gallery
NewMasterArtist

Hungarian designers
Film people from Budapest
Living people
Hungarian cinematographers
Hungarian University of Fine Arts alumni
Year of birth missing (living people)